This is a list of Spanish television related events in 1980.

Events 
 10 January: Spanish Parliament pasess Law 4/1980, that regulates the Radio & Television Organization in Spain. RTVE was configured, by statute, as a legal public entity with its own jurisdiction.

Debuts

Television shows

La 1

Ending this year

La 1 
 El hombre y la Tierra (1974-1980) 
 El Mundo de la música (1975-1980) 
 Fantástico ( 1978-1980)
 Mundo noche (1978-1980) 
 003 y medio (1979-1980)
 Canciones de una vida (1979-1980)

La 2 
 Tribuna internacional (1979-1980)

Foreign series debuts in Spain

Births

Deaths 
 15 March - Félix Rodríguez de la Fuente, host, 52.
 16 May - José Calvo, actor, 64.

See also
 1980 in Spain
 List of Spanish films of 1980

References 

1980 in Spanish television